Delahunt is an Irish family name sometimes spelt Delahunty. It is one of many forms of Ó Dulchaointigh.
  
It can refer to the following people:

Bill Delahunt, member of the United States House of Representatives
Garnet de la Hunt
Jennie Delahunt, English artist
Jim Delahunt, sports presenter
Meaghan Delahunt, Australian novelist
Nancy Delahunt, Canadian curler
Walter Delahunt, Canadian pianist

Business 
De La Hunt Broadcasting, a radio broadcasting company in Minnesota

Fiction 
Richard Delahunt, a character in the video games Hitman: Contracts and Hitman: Blood Money

References